Majhgaun (Nepali: माझगाउँ) is a village where the headquarters of the Chhetrapa Village Development Committee  (क्षेत्रपा गा.वि.स.) are located in Kshetrapa(Majhgau-माझगाउँ) in Dolakha District in Bagmati Province of north-eastern Nepal.

The community is served by a high school named "Shree Kshetrawati Higher Secondary School" at Peepal Daada, Majhgaun. Through the middle of the village Namdu Jugu road is under construction. Seasonal bus service is available from Kathmandu but about 170 km ride takes 6 to 8 hours due to narrow, winding roads.

Historically, the population of Kshetrapa has been mostly the Jirel people.

Kshetrapa is located along one of the alternate routes from Kathmandu to the summit of Mount Everest.

References 

Populated places in Dolakha District